Hysen Efendi Hoxha (1861–1934) was an Albanian politician, mayor of Gjirokastër, and the uncle of Enver Hoxha.

Life
Hysen Hoxha was born in Gjirokastër, where his father Beqir was a supporter of the local branch of the League of Prizren. He studied theology in Istanbul. Hoxha was responsible for opening the first Albanian-language school in his region (named "Liria") and at the time of his nephew Enver Hoxha's birth in 1908 chaired a committee of national renaissance in the province. He also founded a folk ensemble. In November 1912 he served as a delegate from Gjirokastër to the Vlorë meeting on the occasion of the Albanian Declaration of Independence.

His impact on the early life of his nephew Enver Hoxha was felt due to Enver's father having been overseas in the United States of America as an economic emigrant.

References
 Enver Hoxha: 1908-1985. Tirana: Institute of Marxist–Leninist Studies at the Central Committee of the Party of Labour of Albania. 1986. p. 17.
 Studime historike Vol. 40, No. 23. Akademia e Shkencave, Instituti i Historisë. 1986. p. 163.
 Biberaj, Elez. Albania: A Socialist Maverick. Boulder, CO: Westview Press. 1990. p. 16.
 Hoxha, Enver. Vitë të vegjëlisë. Tirana: 8 Nëntori. 1983.
 Schmidt-Neke, Michael. Enstehung und Ausbau der Königsdiktatur in Albanien, 1912-1939. München: R. Oldenbourg Verlag. 1987. p. 320.
 Zlatar, Pero. Albanija u eri Envera Hoxhe Vol. II. Zagreb: Grafički zavod Hrvatske. 1984. pp. 23–26.

Specific

20th-century Albanian politicians
19th-century Albanian politicians
Activists of the Albanian National Awakening
People from Gjirokastër
People from Janina vilayet
Albanian former Muslims
Albanian atheists
1861 births
1934 deaths
Mayors of Gjirokastër
All-Albanian Congress delegates